The DOXA Documentary Film Festival is a documentary film festival based in Vancouver, British Columbia, Canada. It is held annually held for 10 days in May, and is presented by The Documentary Media Society, a non-profit organization.

The festival was staged for the first time in 2000. Originally intended as a once-only event, by the time of its launch the organizers had decided to organize a permanent biennial festival; following the second festival in 2002, it became an annual event thereafter.

Awards 
DOXA award winners are given on the basis of three major criteria: "success and innovation in the realization of the project’s concept; originality and relevance of subject matter and approach; and overall artistic and technical proficiency". Jury members are filmmakers, film critics, and industry professionals.
 DOXA Feature Documentary Award
 Colin Low Award for Canadian Documentary
 Nigel Moore Award for Youth Programming
 DOXA Short Documentary Award

References

External links 
 

Film festivals in Vancouver
Documentary film festivals in Canada
Canadian documentary film awards
Film festivals established in 2000
2000 establishments in British Columbia